Highs in the Mid-Sixties, Volume 5 (subtitled Michigan) is a compilation album in the Highs in the Mid-Sixties series, featuring recordings that were released in Michigan.  Highs in the Mid-Sixties, Volume 6 and Highs in the Mid-Sixties, Volume 19  are later volumes that feature bands from this state.

Release data

This album was released in 1983 as an LP by AIP Records (as #AIP-10007).

Notes on the tracks

Other tracks by the Underdogs and the 4 of Us are included on Highs in the Mid-Sixties, Volume 6, as are others by the Blues Company (though under a slightly different name).

Track listing

Side 1

 The Mussies: "12 O'Clock, July" (The Mussies), 3:45
 The Roadrunners: "Roadrunner Baby" (Thurman), 3:25
 The Unknown: "Shake a Tail Feather" (Hayes/Williams/Rice), 2:30
 The Bossmen: "I'm Ready" (Bartholomew), 2:10
 The Underdogs: "Surprise, Surprise" (Mick Jagger/Keith Richard), 2:40
 The Run-A-Rounds: "I Couldn't Care Less" (Roy/Valente), 2:20
 The Boss Five: "You Cheat Too Much" (Delorio), 2:20
 The Rationals: "Turn On" (The Rationals/Carrington), 2:10

Side 2

 The Quests: "Shadows in the Night" (R. Fritzen), 2:35
 Peter & the Prophets: "Don't Need Your Lovin'" (Samuelson/Boylan) — rel. 1966
 The Jammers: "You're Gonna Love Me Too" (Groendal/Snyder), 1:40
 The Undecided?: "I Never Forgot Her" (Blackmer), 2:20
 The Rationals: "Little Girls Cry" (Deon Jackson), 2:16
 The Legends: "I'll Come Again" (Hamberg/Vasquez)
 The 4 of Us: "Baby Blue" (Bob Dylan), 2:11
 The Blues Company: "Experiment in Color" (Tim Ward), 2:00

Pebbles (series) albums
Psychedelic rock compilation albums
1983 compilation albums